Sugar Music is an Italian family-owned music publisher and record label, based in Milan.

Founded by Ladislao Sugar, the company has been run by his grandson Filippo Sugar since 1997.

History
Established in 1932 by Ladislao Sugar's insight and entrepreneurial spirit, the company soon made a name for itself as the foremost independent record company in Italy, and is currently among the most prominent Italian music publishers on the European market. It was, until 1974, headquartered in the Galleria del Corso in the historic center of Milan.

Currently, the company serves as a creative hub run by Filippo Sugar, President and CEO, representing the third Sugar family generation. Filippo is the only child of Piero Sugar and Caterina Caselli, a key figure in talent scouting and record production in Italy.

Sugarmusic’s catalogue include over 80,000 titles and features songwriters and composers like Ennio Morricone, Nino Rota, Luis Bacalov, Armando Trovaioli, Giancarlo Bigazzi, Umberto Tozzi, Lucio Battisti, Fred Buscaglione, Paolo Conte, and smash hits like "Gloria", "Ti amo", "Self Control", "Nessuno mi può giudicare", "Un'estate italiana", "Con te partirò/Time to Say Goodbye".

Over time, the Sugar recording label has discovered and developed global superstar Andrea Bocelli, Elisa, Negramaro, Malika Ayane, Raphael Gualazzi. Today, the label boasts 23 artists signed exclusively, including some of the most promising developing, Italian artists. These include, Madame, Speranza, Michael Leonardi, Lucio Corsi, Sissi, NYV, Fuera and Kety Fusco.

The Sugar Music publisher roster features 42 exclusive writers, including Giuliano Sangiorgi, Salmo, Willie Peyote, Mannarino, Stabber;  Ketama126, as well as music publishing deals with Tiziano Ferro and Cesare Cremonini.

Artists
Among the international artists of the record label, Andrea Bocelli and the Negramaro stand out.

Andrea Bocelli
Negramaro
Raphael Gualazzi
Malika Ayane
Motta
Madame
Speranza
Lucio Corsi
Riccardo Sinigallia
NYV
Sissi
Fuera
NDG
Kety Fusco
BAIS 
Viito
YOUNG KALI
Michael Leonardi
GIOIA

References

External links
 

Italian record labels